Tashigang is a village near an ancient monastery in the state of Himachal Pradesh, India. It is a settlement in Kinnaur and is located in the Sutlej river valley near the India-Tibet border. National Highway 22(5New) connects Khab with state capital Shimla. Below Tashigangis flows the Sutlej river, which originates from Mansarovar Lake in Tibet. The villages of Nako and Khab are nearby. Current Tashigang is controlled by India but claimed by Zanda County, Ngari Prefecture, Tibet, China.

Claims 
According to some maps, the territory is disputed between India and China, while in others it is not.

Transportation 
Tashigang can be reached by foot from Nako and Khab.

See also 
 Shipki La
 India-China Border Roads 
 Line of Actual Control
 List of disputed territories of India

References 

Villages in Kinnaur district